The  is an anthology of Chinese poems (Jp. kanshi 漢詩) and 31-syllable Japanese waka (Jp. tanka 短歌) for singing to fixed melodies (the melodies are now extinct).

The text was compiled by Fujiwara no Kintō ca. 1013. It contains 588 Chinese poems by some 30 Chinese poets, including Bai Juyi (Po Chü-i; 772－846), Yuan Zhen (Yüan Shen; 779－831) and Xu Hun (Hsü Hun; fl ca 850) together with some 50 Japanese poets of Chinese verse such as Sugawara no Michizane, Minamoto no Shitagau (911－983), Ōe no Asatsuna (886－957), Ki no Haseo (845－912), and others. The 216 waka poems in the collection are by 80 famous poets such as Kakinomoto no Hitomaro, Ki no Tsurayuki, Ōshikōchi Mitsune, among many other illustrious names. 

Wakan rōeishū is divided into two books: "Seasonal poems" occupy the first book, while Miscellanea are in the second. The poems are further sub-classified by common topics (Jp. dai 題); kanshi alternate with waka on the same subject.

Notes

Late Old Japanese texts
Japanese poetry anthologies
11th-century Japanese books